Grand Forks Central High School (GFC) is a public senor high school in the Grand Forks Public Schools district. It is located in downtown Grand Forks.

History
GFC was originally built in 1882 at a cost of $26,000.

Its first graduating class graduated in 1886, and consisted of three women, Emma Oldham and Mary Parsons.

The original building underwent major renovation in 1911, and construction was completed on the current main building in 1917. The original structure was demolished in 1937 to build the auditorium, as part of The New Deal's Public Works Administration program. The most recent addition was a fine arts wing, a new home for the  department, which for the first time included a back stage and a proper set storage area, as well as a black box theater.

Grand Forks Central is the oldest still-operating  in North Dakota.

Athletics and awards

Sports offered
 Basketball (boys' and girls') 
 Baseball (boys')
 Cheerleading (co-ed)
 Cross-country (boys' and girls')
 Football (boys')
 Gymnastics (girls')*
 Hockey (boys')
 Hockey (girls')*
 Soccer (boys' and girls')
 Softball (girls')
 Swimming & Diving (boys' and girls')*
 Golf (boys' and girls')
 Tennis (boys' and girls')
 Track and Field (boys' and girls')
 Volleyball (girls')
 Wrestling (co-ed)
Figure skating
RRHS and Central High School have combined teams in several sporting areas, due to low participation numbers. Co-op sports have been adopted the mascot of the "Knightriders".

Championships
State Class 'A' boys' basketball: 1927, 1946, 1947, 1952, 1956, 1970, 1974, 1996
State Class 'A' boys' track and field: 1903, 1904, 1906, 1908 co-champions, 1911, 1913, 1914 co-champions, 1915, 1916, 1922 co-champions, 1926, 1927, 1940, 1955, 1956, 1961, 1963, 1964, 1966
State Class 'A' girls' track and field: 1986, 1987
State Class 'A' football: 1906, 1913, 1915, 1916, 1931, 1934, 1938, 1946, 1963
State Class 'AAA' football: 2005
State boys' hockey: 1961, 1962, 1963, 1964, 1965, 1966, 1967, 1968, 1969, 1970, 1971, 1972, 1973, 1975, 1976, 1977, 1979, 1980, 1983, 1984, 1993, 1995, 2003, 2004, 2010, 2017, 2018, 2019, 2021
State Class 'A' baseball: 2000, 2006
State girls' soccer: 1997
State Class 'A' cross country: 1998
State Class 'A' speech: 1981, 1982, 1984

Notable alumni
Brooks Bollinger (b. 1979), professional football quarterback
Clifton Emmet "Cliff" Cushman (1938–1966), Olympic hurdler and pilot, U.S. Air Force; killed in the Vietnam War;  Cushman Field in Grand Forks is named in his honor
Jerry Gaetz (1914–1964), North Dakota state senator
Glenn Hansen (b. 1952), professional basketball player who played for the Kansas City Kings and Chicago Bulls and founder of a local construction company
Stuart McDonald (b. 1931), editorial cartoonist and two-term Republican representative in the North Dakota House of Representatives
Lute Olson (1934-2020) Hall of Fame Collegiate basketball coach. Led Central to 1952 State Basketball title.
Dickie Peterson (1946–2009), co-founder, bass player and lead singer of influential hard rock band Blue Cheer
Richard St. Clair (b. 1946), prominent composer of modern classical music
Andrew Towne (b. 1982), member of the team that completed the first human-powered transit of the Drake Passage.
Kathryn Uhrich (b. 1965), Professor of Chemistry, Dean of Math and Physical Sciences at Rutgers University; founder of Polymerix Corporation

References

External links

History of Central High School

Public high schools in North Dakota
Buildings and structures in Grand Forks, North Dakota
North Dakota High School Activities Association (Class A)
North Dakota High School Activities Association (Class AAA Football)
Works Progress Administration in North Dakota
Schools in Grand Forks County, North Dakota
1882 establishments in Dakota Territory
Educational institutions established in 1882